This is a list of cricketers who have played for Kent County Cricket Club in top-class matches. The county club has its origin in the Kent Club founded at Canterbury on 6 August 1842. A similar organisation was formed at Maidstone in 1859 and, in 1870, these two amalgamated to create the present county club. Like the Kent county teams formed by earlier organisations, including the old Town Malling club, the county club has always been classified as a top-class team. The players listed have played for the club in first-class cricket, List A cricket or Twenty20 cricket matches.

The details are the player's usual name followed by the years in which he was active as a Kent player and then his name is given as it would appear on modern match scorecards produced by the county club. Note that many players represented other teams besides Kent. Current players are shown as active to the latest year in which they played for the club. The list excludes Second XI and other players who did not play for the club's first team. Players who represented the county before August 1842 are included only if they also played for the county club after its initial formation.

A

B

C

D

E

F

G

H

I

J

K

L

M

N

O
 Niall O'Brien (2004–2006) : NJ O'Brien
 Sid O'Linn (1951–1954) : S O'Linn
 Mike Olton (1962–1963) : MF Olton
 Marcus O'Riordan (2019–2022) : MK O'Riordan
 Edward O'Shaughnessy (1879–1885) : E O'Shaughnessy
 Cuthbert Ottaway (1869–1870) : CJ Ottaway

P

Q
 Qais Ahmad (2021–2022) : Qais Ahmad
 Matt Quinn (2021–2022) : MR Quinn

R

S

T

U
 Derek Ufton (1945–1962) : DG Ufton
 Derek Underwood (1963–1987) : DL Underwood

V
 Bryan Valentine (1927–1948) : BH Valentine
 Martin van Jaarsveld (2005–2011) : M van Jaarsveld
 Alan Verrinder (1977) : AOC Verrinder
 Hardus Viljoen (2016–2019): GC Viljoen

W

Y
 William Yardley (1868–1878) : W Yardley
 Yasir Arafat (2007–2008) : Yasir Arafat
 Yasir Shah (2017): Yasir Shah
 Alfred Young (1890) : AJK Young

See also
 List of Kent County Cricket Club captains
 List of Gentlemen of Kent cricketers
 List of Kent county cricketers to 1842

Notes

References

Bibliography
Carlaw D (2020a) Kent County Cricketers A to Z. Part One: 1806–1914 (Revised edition). (Available online at the Association of Cricket Statisticians and Historians. Retrieved 2020-12-19.)
Carlaw D (2020b) Kent County Cricketers A to Z. Part Two: 1919–1939. (Available online at the Association of Cricket Statisticians and Historians. Retrieved 2020-12-19.)

Players

Kent
Cricketers